The 1934 United States Senate election in Pennsylvania was held on November 6, 1934. Incumbent Republican U.S. Senator David A. Reed sought re-election to another term, but was defeated by Democratic nominee Joseph F. Guffey.

As of 2021, this is the last time the following counties have voted Democratic in a Senate election: Adams, Blair, Bedford, Cumberland, Franklin, Juniata, and Pike.

Major candidates

Democratic
Joseph F. Guffey, former member of the Democratic National Committee

Republican
David A. Reed, incumbent U.S. Senator
Gifford Pinchot, former Governor

Results

|-
|-bgcolor="#EEEEEE"
| colspan="3" align="right" | Totals
| align="right" | 2,942,275
| align="right" | 100.00%
| align="right" | 
|}

References

1934
Pennsylvania
United States Senate